The first Kosciusko County Jail was built in 1837 of  square logs. It was two stories tall with a trap door from the second story floor to access the ground floor. The next jail was made of brick.  Like the first jail, it was located on Courthouse Square. By 1869 this second structure was in serious need of repair. Frequent jail breaks from the second jail, led the county to hire George Garnsey of Chicago to design a new jail.  The most notable jailbreak resulted when prisoners pushed bricks out of the wall.

The "Castellated Gothic" design represents the late 1800s American jail design standards. The massive, rough stone blocks suggest a feeling of strength and permanence. Narrow windows and second story main entrance imply the restrictive function of the structure. To stop future jailbreaks, iron dowel rods pierced the stone blocks.  This would prevent the stones from being pushed out. The jail was completed in 1870, one block east of the courthouse square. The cost was $48,000, and the builder was Richard Epperson.

The second story contained the sheriff's residence.  Thus the sheriff was always on duty and acted as a live-in warden. The most notable prisoners held were several Culver bank robbers who were defended in Warsaw by Clarence Darrow.  Later they would be involved in the John Dillinger escape in Lake County, Indiana.

Design
 Architect George Garnsey said that the Jail was constructed in a style known as Rock Glace. The building's appearance is of a small castle, with a turret, fenestration with pointed arches, and crenellations across the front elevation parapet.

The jail is two stories on an elevated basement.  The main entrance is up a flight of steps. Two windows flank the stairs on the basement level.  All the windows are double-hung sashes with one-over-one lights. The first floor story has three bays with a large door in the center bay. The second floor has four windows. The sides of the main building have three bays on each level.

On the north side a one-story garage was added in 1937.  It is the only major alteration of the exterior. The stonework matches the original building. In 1964 the garage was made into office space. After 1900 modern plumbing, heating, and electricity were installed. The second story served as the sheriff's residence until 1974.

Museum
The building is now owned by the Kosciusko County Historical Society and operated as the Kosciusko County Jail Museum.

See also
Chinworth Bridge
Warsaw Courthouse Square Historic District
Winona Lake Historic District

References

External links
 Kosciusko County Jail Museum - Kosciusko County Historical Society

Jails on the National Register of Historic Places in Indiana
Government buildings completed in 1870
Buildings and structures in Kosciusko County, Indiana
Museums in Kosciusko County, Indiana
Prison museums in the United States
History museums in Indiana
National Register of Historic Places in Kosciusko County, Indiana
1870 establishments in Indiana
Jails in Indiana